Viktor Savin (21 November 1888 – 11 August 1943) was a Komi poet who lived in the Soviet Union. He created the anthem of the Komi Republic.

Komi people
1888 births
1943 deaths
Soviet poets